Jürgen Melzer was the defending champion but withdrew due to injury.

Lukáš Rosol won the title, defeating Steve Johnson in the final, 6–0, 6–3.

Seeds

Draw

Finals

Top half

Bottom half

References
 Main Draw
 Qualifying Draw

Irving Tennis Classic - Singles
2014 Singles